Fadini is an Italian surname. Notable people with the surname include:

Emilia Fadini (1930–2021), Spanish-born Italian harpsichordist, musicologist, and teacher
Rubens Fadini (1927–1949), Italian footballer
Stadio Rubens Fadini

Italian-language surnames